Kevin Bryan Barajas (born February 18, 1996) is an American soccer player who plays for German club LSK Hansa in Regionalliga Nord.

Career

Youth and college 
Barajas played four years of college soccer at the University of Kentucky between 2014 and 2017, where he made a total of 69 appearances, scoring 4 goals and tallying 3 assists.

While at college, Barajas appeared for Premier Development League side Cincinnati Dutch Lions during their 2017 season.

Professional 
Following a successful open tryout, Barajas signed with United Soccer League side Atlanta United 2 ahead of their inaugural season.

For the 2021 season Barajas had spells with UPSL side Kalonji Pro-Profile and later joined expansion club Georgia Storm FC of the NPSL.

On February 16, 2022, Barajas signed with German fourth-tier Regionalliga Nord club LSK Hansa.

Personal life
Barajas was born in the United States and is of Mexican descent. As a child he followed Chivas.

References

External links 
 Kentucky Wildcats Profile
 

1996 births
Soccer players from Atlanta
Living people
Association football midfielders
American soccer players
American sportspeople of Mexican descent
Kentucky Wildcats men's soccer players
Cincinnati Dutch Lions players
Atlanta United 2 players
Lüneburger SK Hansa players
USL League Two players
USL Championship players
United Premier Soccer League players
National Premier Soccer League players
American expatriate soccer players
American expatriate soccer players in Germany